Ramachandrapura Math (monastery) is a Hindu monastery located in Hosanagara taluk of Shimoga, Karnataka. The Matha is followed mainly by the Havyaka Brahmins  in Uttara Kannada, Dakshina Kannada, Udupi, Shimoga districts of Karnataka and Kasaragod district of Kerala . It was established by Adi Shankaracharya  originally near Gokarna, a holy town on the west coast of India. The matha was initially known as Raghuthama Matha. The Swami (or guru) of the matha is a celibate (brahmacharya), but this is not a strict requirement though and  a Havyaka by birth. He adds the title Bharati to his name. The present guru is Jagadguru Shankaracharya Shri Raghaveshwara Bharathi MahaSwamiji.   He was initiated sanyasa by his guru Jagadguru Shankaracharya shri Ragavendra Bharati mahaswamiji the 35th Pontiff of Shri Ramachandrapura Mutt.

Adi Shankaracharya appointed his disciple Shri Vidyananda as the first guru of the matha. The matha has an unbroken lineage of mathadishas (head of the matha) since then. Shri Raghavaeshwara Bharathi is the 36th guruji.

See also
Raghaveshwara Bharathi

References

Hindu monasteries in India
Shankaracharya mathas in India
Hindu organisations based in India
Hinduism in Karnataka